Orville Caldwell (February 8, 1896–September 24, 1967) was an American actor of the stage and screen and a politician later in life.

Film 
Caldwell appeared in 21 films between 1923 and 1938, but was inactive for 7 years starting in 1928 during the transition from silent film to sound film. He is best known for his role as Tony in The Patsy (1928) costarring with Marion Davies. Most of his starring roles are lost today, and most of his talking roles were uncredited. 

Following his departure from film, Caldwell transitioned to politics, serving from 1942 to 1951 as the first deputy mayor of Los Angeles.

Politics 
Caldwell served as Deputy Mayor of Los Angeles from 1942 to 1951. 

In response to an influx of migration of African Americans to Los Angeles during the Second World War, Caldwell proposed a ban on African American immigration into California.

Filmography

Silent films

Sound films

References

External links

American actors
1896 births
1967 deaths